Charles Addison Riddle III (born in Marksville, Louisiana June 8, 1955) is a Louisiana lawyer and Democratic politician. Riddle was elected to the 28th District of the Louisiana House of Representatives in 1992, and served through 2003. He was elected in 2002 as the 33rd District Attorney of Avoyelles Parish.

Legislative career 
During his term as a member of the House of Representatives, Riddle introduced legislation that became Act 1118 of the 1999 Legislature that prohibited the State from recovery of the cost that the state paid under medicaid for individuals who were nursing home residents. The act protected their homes from seizure.  In 1997, Representative Riddle introduced the Constitutional Amendment authorizing the Louisiana State University System to take control of the Louisiana Charity Hospital System. This was Act 1488 of 1997.  In 2001 Riddle co-authored the bill that became Act 402 of the 2001 Legislature creating Louisiana State University in Alexandria as a four-year institution.  Representative Riddle handled the legislation on the House side. See page 33 of the House Journal referenced.

Riddle was re-elected in 1995 defeating two challengers in the first stage of the nonpartisan blanket primary.  He ran unopposed in 1999.

District Attorney
In 2002, Riddle ran for District Attorney of Avoyelles Parish, representing the 12th Judicial District, and was elected. He took office in 2003. He is serving in his third term, running without opposition in 2008 and 2014.

Riddle was elected President of the Louisiana District Attorneys Association for the term 2008-2009. He serves as a Past President of the LDAA, including Chairman of the Legislative Committee.

In 2012, Charles Riddle III was selected for the Louisiana Justice Hall of Fame, together with eight other honorees. Riddle also serves on the LSU-Alexandria Foundation Board.

In December 2012, Charles Riddle published his first book, The Outhouse Report, through Xlibris Publishing, a self-publishing business.  The memoir relates his experiences in the Louisiana House of Representatives from 1992 through 2002. Smiley Anders of the Morning Advocate featured selections from the book in his January 28, 2013 column. His second book, The life and Diary of John P. Waddill - The Lawyer Who Freed Solomon Northup, 1813-1855 was published June 11, 2019 by UL Press.

References 

Living people
Louisiana lawyers
Louisiana local politicians
Democratic Party members of the Louisiana House of Representatives
People from Marksville, Louisiana
1955 births